A by-election was held for the New South Wales Legislative Assembly electorate of Illawarra on 7 July 1880 following the resignation of Samuel Gray.

Dates

Result

Samuel Gray resigned.

See also
Electoral results for the district of Illawarra
List of New South Wales state by-elections

References

1880 elections in Australia
New South Wales state by-elections
1880s in New South Wales